Alyce is a feminine given name.

Alyce or Allyce may refer to:

 Allyce Beasley (born 1954), American actress and comedienne
 Alyce Clarke (born 1939), American politician
 Alyce Cleese (born 1944), American psychotherapist, author and talk radio host, former wife of actor/comedian John Cleese
 Alyce Frank (born 1932), American landscape painter
 Alyce King (1915–1996), one of The King Sisters singing group
 Alyce McCormick (1899–1932), American actress
 Alyce Miller, American writer and academic
 Alyce Mills (1899–1990), American actress
 Alyce Parker (born 2000), Australian rules footballer
 Alyce Platt (born 1963), Australian actress and singer
 Alyce Rogers, American opera singer
 Alyce Spotted Bear (1945–2013), Native American educator and politician
 Alyce Wood (born 1992), Australian canoeist

See also 
 Alice (name)
 Ellice (given name)
 Ellise Chappell (born 1992), English actress
 Ellyse Perry (born 1990), Australian female cricketer and footballer

English-language feminine given names